Vittorio Sentimenti (18 August 1918 – 27 September 2004), also known as Sentimenti III, is a former Italian football player from Bomporto in the Province of Modena who played as an attacking midfielder.

Career
Sentimenti played club football for several Italian teams, most prominently Juventus, Modena, Lazio, and Torino.

Personal life
The Sentimenti family were prominent in Italian football, several of Lucidio's relatives in the game include his brothers; Ennio, Lucidio, Primo and Arnaldo, his cousins Lino and nephews Roberto and Andrea Sentimenti.

Vittorio played for Modena, Juventus and Lazio during the same time as his goalkeeping brother Lucidio Sentimenti, both as prominent squad members. Primo played with them both at Lazio for a while.

Honours

References

Italian footballers
Serie A players
Serie B players
Modena F.C. players
Juventus F.C. players
S.S. Lazio players
Torino F.C. players
1918 births
2004 deaths
Association football midfielders